Alan Williams may refer to:

Entertainment
 Alan Williams (actor) (born 1954), British actor
 Alan Williams (novelist) (1935–2020), British novelist
 Alan Williams (composer) (born 1965), American musician
 Alan Williams (born 1948), singer with the Rubettes

Politics
 Sir Alan Meredith Williams (1909–1972), British diplomat
 Alan Lee Williams (born 1930), British Member of Parliament for Hornchurch
 Alan Williams (Swansea West MP) (1930–2014), British Member of Parliament for Swansea West
 Alan Williams (Carmarthen MP) (born 1945), British Member of Parliament for Carmarthen
 Alan Williams (Florida politician) (born 1975), American politician

Sports
 Alan Williams (rugby union) (1893–1984), American who competed in the 1924 Summer Olympics
 Alan Williams (Australian footballer) (1917–1988), Australian rules footballer
 Alan Williams (footballer, born 1938) (1938–2017), English footballer
 Alan Williams (canoeist) (born 1954), British sprint canoer
 Alan Williams (basketball) (born 1993), American basketball player
 Alan Williams (American football) (born 1969), American football coach
 Alan Williams (cyclist) (born 1948), English track cyclist

Other
 Alan Williams (economist) (1927–2005), British health economist
 Alan Williams (immunologist) (1945–1992), immunologist
 Alan Williams (bishop) (born 1951), Roman Catholic Bishop of Brentwood, England

See also
Allan Williams (1930–2016), businessman, booking agent to the Beatles
Allan Williams (politician) (1922–2011), Attorney-General of British Columbia, 1979–1983
Al Williams (disambiguation)